KLAT (1010 AM "TUDN Radio Houston") is a commercial radio station in Houston, Texas. It is owned by Latino Media Network; under a local marketing agreement, it is programmed by former owner TelevisaUnivision's Uforia Audio Network, and airs a Spanish-language sports radio format from the TUDN Radio Network.  The station serves as the Spanish language flagship radio station of the Houston Astros baseball team and the Houston Rockets basketball team and also airs Houston Dynamo FC soccer games.

KLAT has studios and offices located at 5100 Southwest Freeway in Uptown Houston.  The transmitter site is on West Little York Road in northwest Houston.  By day, KLAT broadcasts at 5,000 watts.  But to protect other stations on 1010 AM, a Canadian clear-channel frequency, KLAT must reduce power at night to 3,600 watts.

History

Early years as KODA
On July 31, 1961, the station signed on as KODA.   It was put on the air by Paul Taft of the Taft Broadcasting Company  (no relation to Taft Broadcasting of Cincinnati, Ohio).  Taft already owned an FM station, 99.1 KODA-FM, airing a beautiful music format.  But few people had FM radios in those days, so an AM station was added to make the format available to more Houston residents.  KODA was a daytimer during its early years, so it was required to go off the air between sunset and sunrise, while KODA-FM broadcast around the clock.

At first, KODA and KODA-FM simulcast the same beautiful music, competing with ABC-owned 1320 KXYZ, which also played easy listening music.  But beginning in 1967, the Federal Communications Commission (FCC) banned AM-FM combos in most cities from simulcasting around the clock, so most of the day, KODA began airing a slightly different format, adding middle of the road vocals to the mostly instrumental playlist.

Even though 1320 KXYZ was owned by ABC, that station stopped carrying ABC newscasts; they could only be heard on 1360 KWBA (now KWWJ), based in nearby Baytown, Texas. So the AM version of KODA began airing ABC News each hour.

"La Tremenda"
 
In 1978, Group W Westinghouse Broadcasting purchased KODA-AM-FM from Taft and, the following year, re-sold the AM station.  The call sign changed to KLAT in 1979, as the format flipped to popular Spanish-language Regional Mexican music, branded as "La Tremenda."  The name La Tremenda 1010 (which translates to "The Tremendous 1010") was a slogan created by the station's new owners, Marcos Rodriguez, Sr. and his son, Marcos A. Rodriguez, operating as the Spanish Broadcasting Corporation.

In 1984, KLAT obtained FCC authorization for round-the-clock operation, giving KLAT Class B status.   Unfortunately in late 1979, a fire caused the Harris MW-5 transmitter to melt down. The MW-5 used a step up transformer to raise the three phase input power (at 240 volts) to 17,000 volts. The primary wiring had been bundled closely to the secondary wiring and tightly lashed together.  When an insulation breakdown allowed the input wiring to arc, the high temperatures allowed the secondary wires to short to the inputs. This caused extremely high circulating currents and a meltdown of the transformer frame, made of metal castings and laminations.

To add nighttime broadcasts, a seventh tower was added to the array. This was used with five of the existing day towers to make a new parallelogram shaped system. KLAT began night operation at 1,000 watts. This properly protected other stations on AM 1010 as required by FCC rules, but the nighttime signal did not cover all of Houston. This particular authorization was allowed under a waiver for minority-owned stations.  Later on, the station received special authority from the FCC to mitigate interference at night from foreign stations (as many south Florida stations get a break from Cuban interference such as WAXY in South Miami). This special temporary authority (STA) allowed the station to operate at 5,000 watts at night using all seven towers. This improved coverage but did not give KLAT 100% nighttime coverage of Houston.

In 1995 the station built a second tower site in Northwest Houston, using six towers and 3,600 watts for nighttime operation. The lowered power did not cover quite as large an area as the former setup.  But because of the transmitter's better location, it covered more of the Houston radio market. The project used several consultants, ending with duTreil, Lundin and Rackley.

Expanded Band assignment

On March 17, 1997 the FCC announced that eighty-eight stations had been given permission to move to newly available "Expanded Band" transmitting frequencies, ranging from 1610 to 1700 kHz, with KLAT authorized to move from 1010 to 1690 kHz. However, the station never procured the Construction Permit needed to implement the authorization, so the expanded band station was never built.

Spanish-language talk and sports
In 2003, KLAT was bought by Univision, primarily a Spanish-language TV network that was also getting into radio ownership. It became the flagship station of the Major League Baseball's Houston Astros. In 2012, KLAT became part of the Univision America talk radio network.  That continued until July 17, 2015, when the talk format was dropped and replaced by a Spanish Christian contemporary format known as "Amor Celestial" which translates to "Heavenly Love".

In March 2016, KLAT began to air Houston Dynamo soccer games, as a first step into sports radio.  On December 20, 2016, Univision announced that KLAT would be one of the charter affiliates of Univision Deportes Radio, a Spanish-language sports network launched in April 2017. Astros baseball broadcasts refurned for the 2021 season.

Latino Media Network sale
On June 3, 2022, Univision announced it would sell a package of 18 radio stations across 10 of its markets, primarily AM outlets in large cities (including KLAT) and entire clusters in smaller markets such as McAllen, Texas, and Fresno, California, for $60 million to a new company known as Latino Media Network (LMN); Univision proposes to handle operations for a year under agreement before turning over operational control to LMN in the fourth quarter of 2023.

References

External links

FCC History Cards for KLAT

Hispanic and Latino American culture in Houston
LAT
Sports radio stations in the United States
LAT
Radio stations established in 1961
1961 establishments in Texas